Oxygen of Love is an album by New Zealand singer/songwriter Emma Paki released in 1996. Oxygen Of Love, produced by Crowded House and Supertramp’s Mark Hart, was released in 1996 and reached Gold status in New Zealand. The album gained Emma a second nomination for Best Female Vocalist and also Best Album in the Entertainer of the Year Awards in 1996, with her winning the Mana Maori Award. The single "System Virtue" won three awards at the 1993 New Zealand Music Awards - Best Songwriter, Most Promising Female Vocalist and Best Video, as well as Best Music Video at the 1996 TV Guide Television Awards. The video was also the most played New Zealand video of 1994. Her single Greenstone, produced by Neil Finn, charted to #9 on the New Zealand charts and won her a nomination for Best Female Vocalist in the 1995 New Zealand Music Awards.

Track listing

References

Emma Paki albums
1996 albums